Willetta Greene-Johnson was one of the first African-American women to complete a Ph.D. degree in theoretical physics.  Currently, Greene-Johnson is a Senior Lecturer in the physics and chemistry departments at Loyola University Chicago. Greene-Johnson is also a Grammy award winning musician for her song "Saved" (2004).

Early life and education 
Willetta Greene-Johnson was born in Delaware in 1957 and raised in Michigan, surrounded by music and science. Greene's parents were both scientists—her mother, Bettye Washington Greene, was one of the first African-American women to receive a PhD in chemistry and her father, William Miller Greene, was an engineer and former captain in the U.S. Airforce who was trained just a decade after the Tuskegee Airmen. Greene-Johnson's parents exposed her to a wide range of music, including Ella Fitzgerald, Barbra Streisand and The Beatles. One of her earliest memories about her attraction toward orchestral and gospel music started with a performance of Symphony No. 5 (Beethoven).

Greene-Johnson's parents encouraged her to pursue a career in science. She began her undergraduate career as a pre-med major but later studied physics at Stanford University, graduating in 1979 with distinction. In 1979 she joined the AT&T Cooperative Research Fellowship Program (CRFP). As part of the program, she spent a summer working at AT&T's labs. She then pursued her doctoral degree and was one of the first African-American women to complete a PhD in theoretical physics, which she earned in 1988 at the University of Chicago. Her doctoral research focused on the dynamics of vibrational phase relaxation at surfaces.

Career

Research 
After her PhD, Greene-Johnson became a Ford Fellow in the department of physics at Loyola University Chicago, where she worked on surface optico-physical interactions. She joined the faculty of Loyola University Chicago in 1992. She has been Master Teacher of chemistry and physics since 2005. She teaches courses in general chemistry, college physics, quantum mechanics and biophysics. She was a keynote speaker at the 2014 Conference for Undergraduate Women in Physics.

Music 
Her 2004 song, "Saved", is featured on a Grammy Award winning Brooklyn Tabernacle CD project. The song reflects on the meaning of life. It was translated into four languages and distributed worldwide. In 2010 she was named as a Woman of Excellence for her achievements in music. She plays with the Chicago Sinfonietta and has conducted in their annual Martin Luther King concert. As a professor at Loyola University Chicago, Greene-Johnson uses the summer to balance researching physics topics as well as composing and recording music. She has performed with the Memphis Symphony Orchestra. Throughout her career she has preached and written about biblical topics and founded StrategicMusic, Inc. in 2003.

References 

University of Chicago alumni
Stanford University alumni
American gospel singers
Scientists from Delaware
Loyola University Chicago faculty
1957 births
Living people
Singers from Delaware
African-American scientists
20th-century African-American women singers
20th-century American physicists
20th-century American singers
20th-century American women scientists
20th-century American women singers
21st-century American physicists
21st-century American singers
21st-century American women scientists
21st-century American women singers
American women academics
21st-century African-American women singers
African-American physicists